Ahmad Arash Hatifi (born 13 March 1986) is a professional football player who is a midfielder and currently plays for Oakland Stompers. Born in the United States, he represents the Afghanistan national team.

Career

Youth
Born in Oakland, California, Hatifi grew up in Alameda, California and attended Alameda High School where he captained the varsity soccer team. He then started to attend University of California, Davis in 2004 where he started to play for the soccer team in 2005. He captained the team in his junior and senior years. After leaving college, Hatifi played for the Bay Area Ambassadors of the National Premier Soccer League, the fourth tier of American soccer, from 2012 to 2013.

Mumbai
On 1 November 2013 it was confirmed that Hatifi had signed with Mumbai F.C. of the I-League in India. He then made his debut for the side the next day against Bengaluru FC at the Balewadi Sports Complex in which he started and played 87 minutes as Mumbai drew the match 2–2.

International
In 2007, Hatifi was selected to play for Afghanistan in the World Cup qualifiers against Syria and Sri Lanka. He scored his first goal for his country on 20 August 2013 against Pakistan in which he found the net in the 32nd minute as Afghanistan went on to win the match 3–0. He then won his first ever championship with Afghanistan on 11 September 2013 when his country won the 2013 SAFF Championship by beating India 2–0. On 22 May Hatifi scored the second goal in Afghanistan's 3–1 victory over Turkmenistan at the 2014 AFC Challenge Cup. This was also Afghanistan's first every victory at the AFC Challenge Cup in eight attempts.

Unfortunately though after Afghanistan's 0–0 draw with Laos that confirmed their progression out of the group stage, an accident occurred while the Afghan players were being driven back to their hotel. Hatifi suffered injuries along with teammates Zohib Islam Amiri, Faisal Sakhizada, Balal Arezou, and Mustafa Azadzoy, the latter of which will have to take three weeks off to recover, while Hatifi is set to miss two weeks. All five players are set to miss the semi finals against Palestine. Former coach Mohammad Yousef Kargar and current coach Erich Rutemöller also suffered minor injuries.

Career statistics

Club

National team statistics

International goals

Honours

Afghanistan
SAFF Championship: 2013

References

1986 births
Living people
Sportspeople from Oakland, California
Afghan footballers
Afghanistan international footballers
American soccer players
American people of Afghan descent
Sportspeople of Afghan descent
Mumbai FC players
Association football midfielders
Soccer players from California
I-League players
Expatriate footballers in India
Sportspeople from Alameda, California
University of California, Davis alumni